Peter Rudge is a British former rowing cox.

Career 
Rudge began rowing in 1994 at The King's School, Chester. He read Theology at Durham University, where he competed for the university boat club, and graduated in 2003.

Selected for the Great Britain senior squad as an undergraduate, Rudge won bronze as part of the British Coxed Four at the 2001 World Championships, and took silver at the  2003 World Championships in the same event.

He continued his studies at Hughes Hall, Cambridge and represented Cambridge at the 2005 Boat Race. He also took part in the 2006 race.

References

Living people
1981 births
English male rowers
Durham University Boat Club rowers
Alumni of Hughes Hall, Cambridge
Alumni of Van Mildert College, Durham
World Rowing Championships medalists for Great Britain